Justin Charles Garza (born March 20, 1994) is an American professional baseball pitcher for the Los Angeles Angels of Major League Baseball (MLB). He has previously played in MLB for the Cleveland Indians.

Early life and amateur career
Garza grew up in Ontario, California and attended Bonita High School. He was named a high school All-American as a senior by Baseball America after posting a  12-1 record on the mounds with a 0.72 ERA and 101 strikeouts over 88 innings pitched. Garza was selected in the 26th round of the 2012 Major League Baseball Draft by the Cleveland Indians, but opted not to sign.

Garza played college baseball for the Cal State Fullerton Titans for three seasons. As a freshman, he went 12-0 with a 2.03 ERA and a team-leading 95 strikeouts and was named the Big West Conference Pitcher of the Year. Garza's junior season was cut short after he suffered a partially torn UCL that required Tommy John surgery. He finished his collegiate career with 21-7 career record with a 2.64 ERA and 208 strikeouts in  innings pitched.

Professional career

Cleveland Indians/Guardians
Garza was drafted by the Cleveland Indians a second time in the eighth round of the 2015 Major League Baseball Draft. After signing with the team Garza spent rest of the 2015 and much of the 2016 rehabbing from his surgery before being assigned to the Arizona League Indians towards the end of the season. In 2017, Garza pitched for the Single-A Lake County Captains, posting a 4-6 record and 5.83 ERA in 26 appearances. In 2018, Garza split the season between the Low-A Mahoning Valley Scrappers and the High-A Lynchburg Hillcats of the Carolina League, accumulating a 5-6 record and 3.36 ERA in 18 games between the two teams. In 2019, Garza returned to Lynchburg, and pitched to a 6-9 record and 4.99 ERA with 109 strikeouts in 119.0 innings of work. 

Garza did not play in a game in 2020 due to the cancellation of the minor league season because of the COVID-19 pandemic. To begin the 2021 season, he was assigned to the Akron RubberDucks of the Double-A Northeast before being promoted to the Triple-A Columbus Clippers after one appearance. In 12 games with Columbus, Garza notched a stellar 0.44 ERA with 28 strikeouts. The Indians selected Garza's contract and promoted him to the major leagues for the first time on June 24, 2021. Garza made his major league debut on June 27, and pitched  innings of 1-run relief with three strikeouts against the Minnesota Twins in an 8-2 loss. Garza earned his first career win on July 31, 2021, after pitching two innings of scoreless relief in a 12-11 victory over the Chicago White Sox.

Garza was designated for assignment by the newly-named Cleveland Guardians on November 19, 2021. After clearing waivers, he was outrighted to the Triple-A Columbus Clippers on November 24, 2021. Garza elected minor league free agency on November 10, 2022.

Los Angeles Angels
On December 12, 2022, Garza signed a one-year major league deal with the Los Angeles Angels.  Garza was optioned to the Triple-A Salt Lake Bees to start the 2023 season.

References

External links
Cal State Fullerton Titans bio

1994 births
Living people
People from Glendora, California
Baseball players from California
Major League Baseball pitchers
Cleveland Indians players
Cal State Fullerton Titans baseball players
Lynchburg Hillcats players
Akron RubberDucks players
Columbus Clippers players
Arizona League Indians players
Mahoning Valley Scrappers players
Lake County Captains players
Glendale Desert Dogs players